A timeline of notable lesbian magazines, periodicals, newsletters, and journals in the United States organized by the initial publication date and then title. For a global list, see the list of lesbian periodicals.

Unknown year

Footnotes

Explanatory notes

References

Sources

External links

Further reading

Archival collections

 Atlanta Lesbian Feminist Alliance Archives. Rubenstein Rare Book & Manuscript Library, Duke University, Durham, North Carolina.
 The Feminist and Lesbian Periodical Collection. Special Collections and University Archives, University of Oregon Libraries, Eugene, Oregon.
 Guide to the Joan Ariel Collection of Lesbian Periodicals. Special Collections and Archives, The UC Irvine Libraries, Irvine, California.
 The June L. Mazer Lesbian Archive at UCLA. UCLA Center for the Study of Women, University of California, Los Angeles, California.
 Lesbian Herstory Archives. Brooklyn, New York.

Lists of LGBT-related periodicals
Lists of magazines published in the United States
 
 Periodicals
 
Lesbian feminist mass media
Periodicals in the United States